The Stormy Night or Stormy Night may refer to:

 The Stormy Night (風雨之夜), a 1925 Chinese film
 Stormy Night (あらしのよるに), a 2005 Japanese film
 The Stormy Night (狂風之夜), a 1952 Hong Kong film
 The Stormy Night (雨夜惊魂), a 2015 Chinese film